Ivor Bennett (16 June 1913 – 16 June 2003) was a Welsh rugby union, and professional rugby league footballer who played in the 1930s and 1940s.

Background
Ivor Bennett was born in Aberkenfig, Wales, and he died aged 90 in Port Talbot, Wales.

Playing career

International honours

Ivor Bennett won a cap for Wales (RU) while at Aberavon RFC in 1937 against Ireland.

County Cup Final appearances

Ivor Bennett played right-, i.e. number 12, in Warrington's 8-4 victory over Barrow in the 1937–38 Lancashire County Cup Final during the 1937–38 season at Central Park, Wigan on Saturday 23 October 1937.

Club career
Bennett made his début for Warrington on Saturday 28 August 1937, and he played his last match for Warrington on Saturday 9 November 1946.

References

External links
Search for "Bennett" at rugbyleagueproject.org
Statistics at wolvesplayers.thisiswarrington.co.uk

1913 births
2003 deaths
Aberavon RFC players
Footballers who switched code
Rugby league players from Bridgend County Borough
Rugby league second-rows
Rugby union players from Aberkenfig
Rugby union props
Wales international rugby union players
Warrington Wolves players
Welsh rugby league players
Welsh rugby union players